Francesco Pietrosanti (born 3 December 1963 in L'Aquila) is a former Italian rugby union player and a current sports director. He played as a scrum-half.

Pietrosanti played his entire career at L'Aquila Rugby, at the National Championship of Excellence, from 1982/83 to 1998/99. He won the National Championship title in 1993/94.

He had 25 caps for Italy, from 1987 to 1993, scoring 5 tries, 20 points on aggregate. He was called for the 1991 Rugby World Cup, without playing.

He has been team manager and sports director, since his retirement.

References

External links

1963 births
Living people
Italian rugby union players
Italy international rugby union players
Rugby union scrum-halves